Western Bypass can refer to several roads, or bypasses

India 
 Western Bypass, Coimbatore
 West Island Freeway, Mumbai
 Dehu Road–Katraj bypass, Pune